Vice Admiral David Lance Johnston,  (born 1962) is a senior officer in the Royal Australian Navy. He served as Deputy Commander Joint Task Force 633 on Operation Slipper in 2010, Commander Border Protection Command from 2011 to 2013 and, following promotion to vice admiral, was posted as Chief of Joint Operations from 2014 until 2018. Johnston was appointed Vice Chief of the Defence Force in July 2018.

Naval career
Johnston graduated from the Royal Australian Naval College in 1982 and subsequently served as Commanding Officer of the frigates,  and HMAS . The latter command included deployment on Operation Quickstep to Fiji in 2006.

His staff appointments include Command and Control specialist staff positions in Australian Defence Headquarters, Operations Manager at Sailors' Career Management and later as Director Joint Plans in Strategic Operations Division, where he developed the military response options for consideration by the government. In July 2007 on promotion to commodore he joined Fleet Headquarters as Commodore Flotillas where he was responsible for planning of maritime operations and the operational training and preparedness of navy's ships, submarines and diving teams. In 2008 he performed the Deputy Coalition Force Maritime Component Commander role and Australian National Commander for Exercise RIMPAC 08. In November 2008 Commodore Johnston assumed the role of J3 (Director General Operations) at Headquarters Joint Operations Command. This role encompassed the operational level execution of all Australian Defence Force operations both overseas and within Australia.

In October 2010, he deployed to Operation Slipper in the Middle East Area of Operations as the Deputy Commander Joint Task Force 633. He supported the Commander JTF in providing national command oversight of all Australian Defence Force elements conducting maritime, land and air operations in Iraq and Afghanistan. He was promoted to rear admiral in March 2011 to perform the role of Deputy Commander of the Combined AS/US Task Force for Exercise Talisman Sabre and assumed the role of Deputy Chief Joint Operations Command on 6 June 2011. He commanded the Defence operations that supported CHOGM 2011 and the visit to Australia by the President of the United States of America, also in 2011. Johnston was appointed Commander Border Protection Command in December 2011, and the next month made a Member of the Order of Australia for "exceptional service" in senior staff appointments and awarded a Commendation for Distinguished Service in recognition of his leadership on Operation Slipper.

Johnston was promoted vice admiral and appointed Chief of Joint Operations on 20 May 2014. After four years in the post, Prime Minister Malcolm Turnbull announced on 16 April 2018 that Johnston would succeed Vice Admiral Ray Griggs as Vice Chief of the Defence Force in July. He was replaced as Chief of Joint Operations by Air Marshal Mel Hupfeld on 24 May.

Johnston was advanced to Companion of the Order of Australia in the June 2022 Queen's Birthday Honours in recognition of his "eminent service to the Australian Defence Force through strategic stewardship and capability integration." Later that month, Johnston's tenure as Vice Chief of the Defence Force was extended for a further two years.

Johnston holds a Master of Science in Operations Research from the United States Navy Postgraduate School in Monterey, California and a Master of Arts in Strategic Studies from the Australian Defence College.

References

|-

|-

1962 births
Australian military personnel of the War in Afghanistan (2001–2021)
Chiefs of Joint Operations (Australia)
Companions of the Order of Australia
Graduates of the Royal Australian Naval College
Living people
Officiers of the Légion d'honneur
Recipients of the Commendation for Distinguished Service
Royal Australian Navy admirals